Jose Encarnacion Zepeda (born May 24, 1989) is an American professional boxer of Mexican descent who challenged for the WBO lightweight title in 2015 and the WBC light welterweight title in 2019. As of August 2020, he is ranked as the world's fifth best active light welterweight by BoxRec, seventh by The Ring and ninth by the Transnational Boxing Rankings Board.

Professional career

Jose began his professional career in 2009.

In December 2010 Jose began working with famed boxing trainer Robert Alcazar former trainer for World Champion Oscar De La Hoya.

In July 2013 he fought former title contender Ricardo Dominguez and won by TKO in the 3rd round.

On 11 July, 2015, Zepeda fought Terry Flanagan in Manchester, England, for the vacant WBO lightweight title. The fight started off entertaining, however, Zepeda was unfortunate enough to injure his shoulder while throwing a punch in the second round, The fight was stopped at the end of the round due to the injury awarding Flanagan the victory.

In February 2019, he unsuccessfully challenged WBC Super lightweight champion Jose Ramirez for his title, losing a Majority decision in a very competitive fight.

In his bout against Jose Pedraza, Zepeda started off fast and built up an early lead on the scorecards. Pedraza would show some signs of a comeback, starting in the fifth round. In the end, Zepeda was too much for his opponent, and was awarded a clear unanimous decision victory.

Professional boxing record

References

External links

Jose Zepeda - Profile, News Archive & Current Rankings at Box.Live

1989 births
Living people
Sportspeople from Long Beach, California
Boxers from California
American male boxers
American boxers of Mexican descent
Lightweight boxers
Light-welterweight boxers